Brijlal Khabri (born 10 May 1961) is an Indian National Congress politician from the state of Uttar Pradesh, India. He is the President of Uttar Pradesh Congress Committee.
He is a former member of parliament from Jalaun constituency, which he won in 1999 as a member of Bahujan Samaj Party.

Brijlal Khabri was appointed president of Uttar Pradesh Congress Committee on 1 October 2022.

Positions held

Electoral Performances

References

Indian National Congress politicians from Uttar Pradesh
Living people
1961 births